Bernard Howell Leach  (5 January 1887 – 6 May 1979), was a British studio potter and art teacher. He is regarded as the "Father of British studio pottery".

Biography

Early years (Japan)
Leach was born in Hong Kong. His mother Eleanor (née Sharp) died in childbirth. He spent his first three years in Japan with his father, Andrew Leach, until he moved back to Hong Kong in 1890.

Leach attended the Slade School of Fine Art and the London School of Art, where he studied etching under Frank Brangwyn.  Reading books by Lafcadio Hearn, he became interested in Japan. In 1909 he returned to Japan with his young wife Muriel (née Hoyle) intending to teach etching. Satomi Ton, Kojima Kikuo, and later Ryūsei Kishida were his pupils.

In Tokyo, he gave talks and attended meetings along with Mushanokōji Saneatsu, Shiga Naoya, Yanagi Sōetsu and others from the "Shirakaba-Group", who were trying to introduce western art to Japan after 250 years of seclusion. 
About 1911 he attended a Raku-yaki pottery party which was his first introduction to ceramics, and through introduction by Ishii Hakutei, he began to study under Urano Shigekichi  (1851–1923), who stood as Kenzan 6th in the tradition of potter Ogata Kenzan (1663–1743). Assisting as interpreter for technical terms was the potter Tomimoto Kenkichi, whom he had met already earlier. From this time Leach wrote articles for the Shirakaba.

In 1913 he also drafted covers for Shirakaba and Fyūzan. Attracted by the Prussian philosopher and art scholar Dr. Alfred Westharp, who at the time was living in Peking, Leach moved to Peking in 1915. There he took on the Name  (for "Leach"), but returned the following year to Japan. It was the year 1919, when young Hamada Shōji visited Leach for the first time. Leach received a kiln from Kenzan and built it up in Yanagi's garden and called it Tōmon-gama. Now established as a potter, he decided to move to England.

In 1920, before leaving, he had an exhibition in Osaka, where he met the potter Kawai Kanjirō. In Tokyo, a farewell exhibition was organized.

Back in England

Leach returned to England in 1920 on the invitation of Frances Horne. Horne was establishing a Guild of Handicrafts within the existing artist colony of St Ives in Cornwall. On the recommendation of a family friend, Edgar Skinner, she contacted Leach to suggest that he become the potter within this group.  Leach and his wife Muriel were accompanied by the young Hamada Shoji and, having identified a suitable site next to the Stennack river on the outskirts of St Ives, the two established the Leach Pottery in 1920.  They constructed a traditional Japanese climbing kiln or 'Noborigama (登り窯)', the first built in the West. The kiln was poorly built and was reconstructed in 1923 by Matsubayashi Tsurunosuke (1894-1932).

In 1934, Leach and Mark Tobey travelled together through France and Italy, then sailed from Naples to Hong Kong and Shanghai, where they parted company, Leach heading on to Japan.

Leach formally joined the Baháʼí Faith in 1940 after being introduced to it by Mark Tobey, who was himself a Baháʼí. A pilgrimage to the Baháʼí shrines in Haifa, Israel, during 1954 intensified his feeling that he should do more to unite the East and West by returning to the Orient "to try more honestly to do my work there as a Baháʼí and as an artist..."

Leach promoted pottery as a combination of Western and Eastern arts and philosophies. His work focused on traditional Korean, Japanese and Chinese pottery, in combination with traditional techniques from England and Germany, such as slipware and salt glaze ware. He saw pottery as a combination of art, philosophy, design and craft – even as a greater lifestyle. A Potter's Book (1940) defined Leach's craft philosophy and techniques; it went through many editions and was his breakthrough to recognition.

Midlife
Leach advocated simple and utilitarian forms. His ethical pots stand in opposition to what he called fine art pots, which promoted aesthetic concerns rather than function. Popularized in the 1940s after the publication of A Potter's Book, his style had lasting influence on counter-culture and modern design in North America during the 1950s and 1960s. Leach's pottery produced a range of "standard ware" handmade pottery for the general public. He continued to produce pots which were exhibited as works of art.

Many potters from all over the world were apprenticed at the Leach Pottery, and spread Leach's style and beliefs. His British associates and trainees include Michael Cardew, Katherine Pleydell-Bouverie, David Leach (his son), Janet Darnell (whom Leach married in 1956) and William Marshall. Another of his students at St Ives was William Worrall who became chief craftsman at the Chalice Well crafts guild in Glastonbury. His American apprentices include Warren MacKenzie (who likewise influenced many potters through his teaching at the University of Minnesota), Byron Temple, Clary Illian and Jeff Oestrich. He was a major influence on the leading New Zealand potter Len Castle who travelled to London to spend time working with him in the mid-1950s. Another apprentice was an Indian potter Nirmala Patwardhan who developed the so-called Nirmala glaze based on an 11th-century Chinese technique. His four Canadian apprentices, John Reeve, Glenn Lewis, Michael Henry and Ian Steele helped to shape the pottery scene in Vancouver and the Canadian west coast during the 1960 and 1970s. The Cypriot potter Valentinos Charalambous trained with Leach in 1950-51.

Leach was instrumental, with Muriel Rose, in organising the only International Conference of Potters and Weavers in July 1952 at Dartington Hall, where he had been working and teaching. It included exhibitions of British pottery and textiles since 1920, Mexican folk art, and works by conference participants, among them Shoji Hamada and US-based Bauhaus potter Marguerite Wildenhain. Another important contributor was Japanese aesthetician Soetsu Yanagi, author of The Unknown Craftsman. According to Brent Johnson, "The most important outcome of the conference was that it helped organize the modern studio pottery movement by giving a voice to the people who became its leaders…it gave them [Leach, Hamada and Yanagi] celebrity status…[while] Marguerite Wildenhain emerged from Dartington Hall as the most important craft potter in America."

Later years
He continued to produce work until 1972 and never ended his passion for travelling, which made him a precursor of today's artistic globalism. He continued to write about ceramics even after losing his eyesight.

The Victoria and Albert Museum in London held a major exhibition of his art in 1977.

The Leach Pottery still remains open today, accompanied by a museum displaying many pieces by Leach and his students.

Honours
 Charles Fergus Binns Medal for Excellence in Ceramics, 1950
 Japan Foundation Cultural Award, 1974
 Companion of Honour, 1973 (UK)
 Order of the Sacred Treasure, 1966 (Japan)
 Commander of the Order of the British Empire, 1962

Edmund de Waal's book
Edmund de Waal, British ceramic artist and professor of Ceramics at the University of Westminster, had been taught pottery by Geoffrey Whiting, a disciple of Leach, at the King's School, Canterbury. Whilst in Japan, de Waal worked on a monograph of Leach, researching Leach's papers and journals in the archive room of the Japanese Folk Crafts Museum,

De Waal's book on Bernard Leach was published in 1998. He described it as "the first 'de-mystifying' study of Leach". "The great myth of Leach", he said, "is that Leach is the great interlocutor for Japan and the East, the person who understood the East, who explained it to us all, brought out the mystery of the East. But in fact the people he was spending time with, and talking to, were very few, highly educated, often Western educated Japanese people, who in themselves had no particular contact with rural, unlettered Japan of peasant craftsmen".

De Waal noted that Leach had looked at only a narrow range of Japanese ceramics.  De Waal also noted that Leach did not speak Japanese, but in fact he did speak the language to a conversational standard; recordings of this are held by the Mingei Film Archive and the Crafts Study Centre, Farnham.

Writings (selected)
1940: A Potter's Book. London: Faber and Faber
New edition, with introductions by Soyetsu Yanagi and Michael Cardew. London: Faber and Faber, 1976, 
1985: Beyond East and West: Memoirs, Portraits and Essays. New edition, London: Faber and Faber (September 1985), 
1988: Drawings, Verse & Belief Oneworld Publications; 3rd edition (1988),

Notes

References

Further reading

 Olding, Simon. (2010). The Etchings of Bernard Leach, Crafts Study Centre.
 Johnson, Brent. (2007). "A Matter of Tradition"
 Cooper, Emmanuel. (2003). Bernard Leach Life & Work. New Haven: Yale University Press.  (cloth)
 Johnson, Brent. (2007). "A Matter of Tradition" in Marguerite Wildenhain and the Bauhaus: An Eyewitness Anthology Dean and Geraldine Schwarz, eds.. Decorah, Iowa: South Bear Press.  (cloth)
 Watson, Oliver. (1997). Bernard Leach: Potter and Artist, London: Crafts Council.
 Weinberg, Robert. (1999).  Spinning the Clay into Stars: Bernard Leach and the Baháʼí Faith. Oxford: George Ronald Publishers.  (paper)
 Ohara Museum of Art/Asahi Shimbun (1980): An Exhibition of the Art of Bernard Leach. Catalogue in Japanese. 
 Sōetsu Yanagi: The Unknown Craftsman''. Foreword by Shōji Hamada. Adapted by Bernard Leach. Kodansha International, 1972.
Leach, Bernard. (1990). Hamada, Potter. Foreword by Warren MacKenzie. Kodansha International 1990 [1975].

External links

 Leach Pottery
 Further information 
 Studio Pottery
 Leach Source Collection and Bernard Leach Archive held at the Crafts Study Centre and hosted online by the Visual Arts Data Service (VADS)
 Historic Leach pottery at Stoke-on-Trent Museums
 
 

1887 births
1979 deaths
Arts and Crafts movement artists
English potters
St Ives artists
Commanders of the Order of the British Empire
Members of the Order of the Companions of Honour
British people of Hong Kong descent
English Bahá'ís
Converts to the Bahá'í Faith
20th-century Bahá'ís
Recipients of the Order of the Sacred Treasure, 2nd class
Cornish pottery
20th-century ceramists
Mingei
Ceramists